Mappianthus is a genus of flowering plants belonging to the family Icacinaceae.

Its native range is southern China to western Malesia. It is found in Assam (India), Bangladesh, Borneo, China, East Himalaya (India), Hainan, Malaya, Myanmar, Sumatera and Vietnam.

The genus name of Mappianthus is in honour of Marcus Mappus (1666–1736), French doctor and botanist from Alsace and son of Marc or Marcus Mappus (1632–1701).
It was first described and published in Anz. Akad. Wiss. Wien, Math.-Naturwiss. Kl. Vol.58 on page 150 in 1921.

Species, according to Kew:
Mappianthus hookerianus 
Mappianthus iodoides

References

Icacinaceae
Asterid genera
Plants described in 1921
Flora of Assam (region)
Flora of East Himalaya
Flora of Bangladesh
Flora of Vietnam
Flora of Malesia
Taxa named by Heinrich von Handel-Mazzetti